Aotea is a suburb of Porirua.

It covers an area of 2.68 km², including a land area of 2.68 km². The area is entirely inland, but many homes have coastal views.

The suburb has two children's playgrounds and a retirement home.

Demography

Aotea had a population of 3,138 at the 2018 New Zealand census, an increase of 846 people (36.9%) since the 2013 census, and an increase of 3,021 people (2582.1%) since the 2006 census. There were 1,062 households. There were 1,491 males and 1,647 females, giving a sex ratio of 0.91 males per female. The median age was 38.6 years (compared with 37.4 years nationally), with 765 people (24.4%) aged under 15 years, 348 (11.1%) aged 15 to 29, 1,572 (50.1%) aged 30 to 64, and 453 (14.4%) aged 65 or older.

Ethnicities were 70.6% European/Pākehā, 8.2% Māori, 7.2% Pacific peoples, 22.0% Asian, and 2.7% other ethnicities (totals add to more than 100% since people could identify with multiple ethnicities).

The proportion of people born overseas was 31.8%, compared with 27.1% nationally.

Although some people objected to giving their religion, 44.6% had no religion, 42.2% were Christian, 4.0% were Hindu, 1.1% were Muslim, 1.1% were Buddhist and 2.2% had other religions.

Of those at least 15 years old, 846 (35.7%) people had a bachelor or higher degree, and 261 (11.0%) people had no formal qualifications. The median income was $52,400, compared with $31,800 nationally. The employment status of those at least 15 was that 1,395 (58.8%) people were employed full-time, 252 (10.6%) were part-time, and 60 (2.5%) were unemployed.

Economy

In 2018, 8% of the workforce worked in healthcare, 7.5% worked in education, 6% worked in construction, 4.2% worked in hospitality, 4.0% worked in transport, and 2.9% of the workforce worked in manufacturing.

Transportation

As of 2018, among those who commute to work, 63.8% drove a car and 4.9% rode in a car. Although Aotea is close to Porirua's main transit hub, less than 1% walked, ran, biked or took public transport to work.

Education

Aotea College is a co-educational state secondary school for Year 9 to 13 students that was founded in 1978.

References

Suburbs of Porirua
Populated places in the Wellington Region